Joseph Brown (26 April 1929 – 30 October 2014) was an English football player and manager.

Career

Playing
Brown started his career with First Division Middlesbrough, where he came through from the juniors team. He joined Burnley in August 1952, but his time at the club was restricted to just six appearances because of a serious back injury. Having suffered a slipped disc in his back at the age of 17, he recovered after the operation and salvaged his playing career. He joined Bournemouth & Boscombe Athletic in June 1954, where he made a total of 215 appearances and scored five goals in the league. He moved in July 1960 to play for Aldershot.

Managerial
Brown re-joined Burnley as a coach in 1961 and was in charge of the Burnley team that won the FA Youth Cup in 1968. Almost two years later, he became first team coach when Jimmy Adamson took over as manager. Brown became manager of Burnley in January 1976, but lost his job in February 1977. Despite being offered another job at the club, he decided to leave. He joined Manchester United where he worked with the youth set-up. He eventually retired and lived in the Burnley area.

Managerial stats
As of 26 August 2007.

Personal life
Brown was born in Cramlington, England. He died on 30 October 2014 in Burnley, following a long illness, at the age of 85.

Notes

1929 births
2014 deaths
People from Cramlington
Footballers from Northumberland
English footballers
Association football midfielders
Middlesbrough F.C. players
Burnley F.C. players
AFC Bournemouth players
Aldershot F.C. players
English football managers
Burnley F.C. managers
Manchester United F.C. non-playing staff
English Football League players

pl:Joe Brown